The 2019–2022 ICC Cricket World Cup Challenge League was the inaugural edition of the ICC Cricket World Cup Challenge League and a cricket tournament which formed part of the 2023 Cricket World Cup Qualification process. The Challenge League replaced the World Cricket League (WCL) which was previously used as the pathway to the Cricket World Cup. The first fixtures took place in September 2019, with all matches having List A status.

The league featured the twelve teams ranked from 21st to 32nd place in the WCL following the conclusion of the 2019 ICC World Cricket League Division Two tournament in Namibia. The twelve teams were split into two groups, with each group playing a six-team tournament three times on an annual basis.

The top team in each group advanced to the Qualifier Play-off, which feeded into the 2022 Cricket World Cup Qualifier tournament. The remaining ten teams could not qualify for the 2023 World Cup.

In addition, either of the top teams in the Challenge League could qualify for promotion to the next edition of the Cricket World Cup League 2 - by outperforming the two last-placed teams in the 2019–22 ICC Cricket World Cup League 2. Whichever two of these four teams were ranked higher in the Qualifier Play-off played in the next League 2 while the two teams ranked lower played in the next Challenge League.

In an attempt to remain in the Challenge League for the next edition, the bottom four teams in this League (two from each section, A and B) would play in a relegation play-off tournament - facing teams hoping to come up from below.

Participants

The following teams were ranked from 21st to 32nd in the World Cricket League following the conclusion of the 2019 ICC World Cricket League Division Two tournament, and were allocated to Groups A and B.

Fixtures
Each group was scheduled to play three times in a single round-robin tournament format, once each year from 2019 to 2022. This amounts to 15 matches per team and a grand total of 90 matches. In July 2019, the International Cricket Council (ICC) announced that the Malaysian Cricket Association and Cricket Hong Kong would host the 2019 rounds of the tournament. However, citing the instability in Hong Kong, the 2019 matches in League B were moved to Oman. In October 2019, the ICC confirmed that Malaysia would again be the host for the 2020 round of matches in League A, with the Uganda Cricket Association hosting the League B matches.

The 2020 League A tournament in Malaysia was originally scheduled to take place in March 2020. However, in March 2020, the tournament was postponed due to the COVID-19 pandemic and rescheduled for 30 September to 10 October 2020. On 10 June 2020, the 2020 League B tournament in Uganda was also postponed due to the pandemic. On 25 August 2020, the rescheduled 2020 League A tournament was postponed again. In December 2020, the ICC announced a revised schedule following the disruption caused by the COVID-19 pandemic. In April 2021, the League A tournament in Canada was postponed by one year, with the League A tournament in Malaysia tentatively brought forward to the end of 2021. In July 2021, the League B tournament scheduled to take place in Jersey in September 2021, was tentatively rescheduled to take place in Hong Kong in December 2021.

Points tables

League A

League B

Statistics

League A

Most runs

Most wickets

League B

Most runs

Most wickets

References

External links
 Group A home at ESPNcricinfo
 Group B home at ESPNcricinfo

International cricket competitions in 2019
International cricket competitions in 2020
International cricket competitions in 2021
International cricket competitions in 2022
Challenge League